Jeff Parker may refer to:

 Jeff Parker (comics), comic book cartoonist
 Jeff Parker (editorial cartoonist)
 Jeff Parker (ice hockey) (1964–2017)
 Jeff Parker (musician) (born 1967), guitarist for the band Tortoise
 Jeff Parker (writer) (born 1974), American novelist
 Jeffrey A. Parker, American businessman
 Jeff Parker, a professional wrestler known as Scott "Jagged" Parker

See also
Geoffrey Parker (disambiguation)